Pavel Alexeevich Zelenoy (5 January 1833 – 10 January 1909) was a Russian admiral, governor of Taganrog and Odessa.

Military career
Pavel Zelenoy was born into a noble family of captain-lieutenant Alexey Nikolaevich Zelenoy. He graduated from the Naval Cadets Corps in 1851. Zelenoy circumnavigated the globe twice - on board frigate "Pallada" in 1852-1854 and on board frigate "Diana" in 1855. In 1854 was promoted to the rank of lieutenant, in 1856-1860 served on board frigate "Askold". 1860-1865 commanded the brig "Almaz", 1866-1869 commanded the corvette "Vityaz".
Retired in 1870 and served on commercial vessels. Participant of the Russo-Turkish War (1877–1878), Zelenoy commanded a squadron of minelayers and was in charge for the transfer of Russian troops from the seaports of the Sea of Marmara to Russia. In 1882 was promoted to the rank of rear-admiral.

Administrative career
In 1882-1885 - Governor of Taganrog, in 1885-1898 - Governor of Odessa, since 1898 - honorary trustee of the board of trustees of Empress Maria's foundations. In 1891 promoted to the rank of lieutenant-general at the Admiralty. In 1902 promoted to the rank of admiral.

Family
Married to Natalia Mikhailovna Verkhovskaya (1842-1901).
His children were; Admiral Alexander Zelenoy (1872-1922) and daughters Ekaterina and Olga

Awards

Russian Awards
Order of St. Anna of 1st degree
Order of Saint Stanislaus of 1st degree
Order of Saint Vladimir of 2nd degree

Foreign Awards
 Order of the Dannebrog (Denmark)
 Order of the Lion and the Sun (Persia)
 Commander Cross to the Order of Christ (Portugal)
 Commander Cross to the Order of the Redeemer (Greece) 
 Order of the Seal of Solomon (Ethiopia)
 Order of St. Sava (Serbia) 
 Order of the Cross of Takovo (Serbia)

References

External links 
 https://web.archive.org/web/20091128111124/http://www.vgd.ru/Z/zelenin.htm
 https://web.archive.org/web/20120225175523/http://misto.odessa.ua/index.php?u=gorod%2Fgradonach%2Fzelenoy

Imperial Russian Navy admirals
Russian nobility
Zelenoy Pavel
1833 births
1909 deaths
Recipients of the Order of St. Anna, 1st class
Recipients of the Order of Saint Stanislaus (Russian)
Recipients of the Order of St. Vladimir
Order of the Dannebrog
Commanders of the Order of Christ (Portugal)
Recipients of the Order of St. Sava
Recipients of the Order of the Cross of Takovo
Naval Cadet Corps alumni